Antonio Bonet Correa (20 October 1925 – 22 May 2020) was a Spanish art historian.

References

1925 births
2020 deaths
Spanish art historians